Aedin Mincks (born October 10, 2000) is an American actor, best known for his roles as Angus Chestnut on A.N.T. Farm and major recurring character Mitch (Ass Face) on Cobra Kai. He is also known for portraying Robert in Ted.

Career
Mincks is known as Angus Chestnut on A.N.T. Farm, which started in 2011. Initially, he was a recurring character for the first two seasons. Mincks became a series regular in season three. Mincks also played Robert in the 2012 comedy film Ted. Currently, Mincks portrays Mitch in Cobra Kai.

Filmography

References

External links
 

2000 births
Living people
American male film actors
American male television actors
American male child actors
21st-century American male actors